Arthrochilus byrnesii, commonly known as the sandstone truffle orchid, is a rare species of flowering plant in the orchid family (Orchidaceae) and is endemic to the far north-west of Australia. It has three dark green leaves at its base and up to fifteen greenish, insect-like flowers with dark reddish black glands on its labellum. This species is known by some authorities as Phoringopsis byrnesii.

Description
Arthrochilus byrnesii is a terrestrial, perennial, deciduous, sympodial herb with an underground tuber which produces daughter tubers on the end of root-like stolons. The petals and lateral sepals turn backwards against the ovary and are inconspicuous. Flowering occurs in March and April.

Taxonomy and naming
Arthrochilus byrnesii was first formally described in 1972 by Donald Blaxell from a specimen collected near the South Alligator River. The description was published in Contributions from the New South Wales National Herbarium from a specimen collected by Norman Byrnes. In 2002 David Jones and Mark Clements changed the name of this orchid to Phoringopsis byrnesii, but the name has not been adopted by some authorities.

Distribution and habitat
The sandstone truffle orchid is a rarely seen species which grows around sandstone boulders and in tussocks of spinifex in the north of the Northern Territory and the Kimberley region of Western Australia.

Ecology
As with other Arthrochilus orchids, A. byrnesii is pollinated by male thynnid wasps of the genus Arthrothynnus although the species involved is not known. It also reproduces asexually by producing new tubers.

References 

byrnesii
Plants described in 1972
Orchids of the Northern Territory
Orchids of Western Australia